is a Japanese professional baseball pitcher for the Yomiuri Giants of Nippon Professional Baseball (NPB).

Career
Yomiuri Giants selected Takagi with the forth selection in the 2011 NPB draft.

On March 31, 2012, Takagi made his NPB debut.

On November 16, 2018, he was selected Yomiuri Giants roster at the 2018 MLB Japan All-Star Series exhibition game against MLB All-Stars.

On December 2, 2020, he become a free agent. On December 9, 2020, Takagi re-signed with the Giants.

References

External links

 NPB.ip

1989 births
Living people
Baseball people from Ishikawa Prefecture
Japanese baseball players
Kokugakuin University alumni
Nippon Professional Baseball pitchers
Yomiuri Giants players